Cerberilla longibranchus is a species of sea slug, an aeolid nudibranch, a marine heterobranch mollusc in the family Aeolidiidae.

Distribution
This species was described from the Russian Pacific Ocean. It has also been reported from Japan.

Description
All Cerberilla species have a broad foot and the cerata are long and numerous, arranged in transverse rows across the body. This species is predominantly brown and the cerata are brown becoming almost black at the tips.

Ecology 
Species of Cerberilla live on and in sandy substrates where they burrow beneath the surface and feed on burrowing sea anemones.

References

Aeolidiidae
Gastropods described in 1941